José Luis Doreste Blanco (born 19 September 1956) is a Spanish sailor and Olympic champion. He was born in Las Palmas de Gran Canaria, Las Palmas. He competed at the 1988 Summer Olympics in Seoul, where he won a gold medal in the Finn class. In 1998–99, he was a crewmember on Fortuna Extra Lights in the Whitbread Round the World Yacht Race.

Biography
He is the brother of Gustavo Doreste and Luis Doreste, and the uncle of Manuel Doreste. Doreste is a five-time Olympian.

Notes

References

External links
 
 
 
 

1956 births
Living people
Spanish male sailors (sport)
Olympic sailors of Spain
Olympic gold medalists for Spain
Olympic medalists in sailing
Medalists at the 1988 Summer Olympics
Sailors at the 1976 Summer Olympics – Finn
Sailors at the 1980 Summer Olympics – Finn
Sailors at the 1984 Summer Olympics – Star
Sailors at the 1988 Summer Olympics – Finn
Sailors at the 1996 Summer Olympics – Star
Real Club Náutico de Gran Canaria sailors
Star class world champions
Volvo Ocean Race sailors
Finn class world champions
World champions in sailing for Spain
Sportspeople from Las Palmas
Mediterranean Games gold medalists for Spain
20th-century Spanish people